The first lady of Pennsylvania is the title attributed to the wife of the governor of Pennsylvania. The honorary position is styled as First Lady or First Gentleman of the Commonwealth of Pennsylvania. To date there have been no female governors of Pennsylvania, and all first spouses have been first ladies.

From 1777 until late 1790, Pennsylvania was governed by a "Supreme Executive Council" whose head had the title of President.  These presidents' wives are included here as well.

List of first ladies of Pennsylvania

External links
 Pennsylvania Governors, Pennsylvania Historical & Museum Commission

 
First Spouses of Pennsylvania
First Spouses
Governor of Pennsylvania